The Kindersley Klippers are a junior "A" ice hockey team based in Kindersley, Saskatchewan, Canada.  They are members of the Saskatchewan Junior Hockey League (SJHL) and play at the West Central Events Centre.

History
The Kindersley Klippers began as the Saskatoon Titans. The Titans played at Harold Latrace Arena and occasionally held home games at Saskatchewan Place (now known as Credit Union Centre). Due to a lack of attendance at their games in Saskatoon, the ownership decided to move the team to Kindersley, where they became known as the Klippers.

The Klippers won the Membercare Cup as SJHL champions in 2002, but were lost the Anavet Cup to the OCN Blizzard of the Manitoba Junior Hockey League. In 2004, the Klippers again won the Membercare Cup, by beating the Weyburn Red Wings. They later won their first Anavet Cup championship by winning the series in the decisive seventh game against the MJHL's Selkirk Steelers. This win sent the Klippers to the Royal Bank Cup as the western representative. They made it to the Royal Bank Cup final against the OPJHL's Aurora Tigers, where they were defeated 7-1. Their record in the 2004 playoffs was 18 wins and 11 losses.

During the 2008 playoffs, the Klippers looked to win the SJHL championship again. The Klippers first defeated the Weyburn Red Wings in five games, then knocked off the Melville Millionaires in six games. They faced the defending league champion Humboldt Broncos in the SJHL championship. The Klippers took a 3-1 series lead over the Broncos, but lost as Humboldt came back with three straight wins to claim the series and championship. The Humboldt Broncos later won the Anavet Cup and the Royal Bank Cup.

On January 8, 2010, the team's home arena, the West Central Events Centre, suffered extensive damage from a fire that destroyed the adjoining rink, Exhibition Stadium. Significant smoke and water damage, along with the loss of the building's lobby, forced the Klippers to move to nearby Eston for the rest of the season.  The team posted an 8-0-1 record in Eston to close out the regular season and finish third in the Sherwood Conference. Kindersley then swept the Notre Dame Hounds in the league quarterfinal to advance to the Sherwood final against the Yorkton Terriers, a close series that they lost in overtime of game seven.

The Klippers played their first game at the repaired West Central Events Centre on October 2, 2010.

Season-by-season standings

Playoffs
1992 Lost quarter-final
Melfort Mustangs defeated Saskatoon Titans 4-games-to-none
1993 DNQ
1994 DNQ
1995 Lost quarter-final
Kindersley Klippers defeated Humboldt Broncos 2-games-to-1
Battlefords North Stars defeated Kindersley Klippers 4-games-to-none
1996 DNQ
1997 Lost quarter-final
Kindersley Klippers defeated Humboldt Broncos 2-games-to-none
Nipawin Hawks defeated Kindersley Klippers 4-games-to-none
1998 Lost semi-final
Kindersley Klippers defeated Melfort Mustangs 4-games-to-none
Nipawin Hawks defeated Kindersley Klippers 4-games-to-1
1999 Lost quarter-final
Humboldt Broncos defeated Kindersley Klippers 4-games-to-2
2000 Lost quarter-final
First in round robin (3-1) vs. Humboldt Broncos and Nipawin Hawks
Battlefords North Stars defeated Kindersley Klippers 4-games-to-1
2001 Lost quarter-final
Nipawin Hawks defeated Kindersley Klippers 4-games-to-none
2002 Won league, lost Anavet Cup
Kindersley Klippers defeated Battlefords North Stars 4-games-to-3
Kindersley Klippers defeated Melfort Mustangs 4-games-to-1
Kindersley Klippers defeated Humboldt Broncos 4-games-to-3 SJHL champions
OCN Blizzard (MJHL) defeated Kindersley Klippers 4-games-to-1
2003 Lost quarter-final
Battlefords North Stars defeated Kindersley Klippers 4-games-to-none
2004 Won league, won Anavet Cup, lost 2004 Royal Bank Cup final
Kindersley Klippers defeated Battlefords North Stars 4-games-to-noneKindersley Klippers defeated Humboldt Broncos 4-games-to-2Kindersley Klippers defeated Weyburn Red Wings 4-games-to-2 SJHL champions
Kindersley Klippers defeated Selkirk Steelers (MJHL) 4-games-to-3 Anavet Cup champions
Fourth in 2004 Royal Bank Cup round robin (1-3)
Kindersley Klippers defeated Grande Prairie Storm (AJHL) 4-3 in semi-final
Aurora Tigers (OPJHL) defeated Kindersley Klippers 7-1 in final
2005 Lost quarter-finalThird in round robin (1-3) vs. La Ronge Ice Wolves and Battlefords North Stars
Battlefords North Stars defeated Kindersley Klippers 4-games-to-none2006 DNQ2007 DNQ2008 Lost finalSecond in round robin (1-1-1) vs. Melville Millionaires and Weyburn Red Wings
Kindersley Klippers defeated Weyburn Red Wings 4-games-to-1Kindersley Klippers defeated Melville Millionaires 4-games-to-2Humboldt Broncos defeated Kindersley Klippers 4-games-to-32009 Lost quarter-finalKindersley Klippers defeated Estevan Bruins 3-games-to-2Weyburn Red Wings defeated Kindersley Klippers 4-games-to-none2010 Lost semi-finalKindersley Klippers defeated Notre Dame Hounds 4-games-to-noneYorkton Terriers defeated Kindersley Klippers 4-games-to-32011 Lost semi-finalKindersley Klippers defeated Weyburn Red Wings 4-games-to-1Yorkton Terriers defeated Kindersley Klippers 4-games-to-none2012DNQ2013Preliminary round  Estevan Bruins defeated Kindersley Klippers 3-games-to-12014Quarter-final  Melville Millionaires defeated Kindersley Klippers 4-games-to-none''

2014–15 roster

See also
 List of ice hockey teams in Saskatchewan

External links
 Kindersley Klippers official site
 Kindersley Klippers at the SJHL's official site

Saskatchewan Junior Hockey League teams
1991 establishments in Saskatchewan
Ice hockey clubs established in 1991
Kindersley